This is a list of universities in Republic of Artsakh.

Universities

State universities 
 Artsakh University (Stepanakert)
 Stepanakert branch of the Agricultural University of Armenia (Stepanakert)

Commercial universities 
 University "Grigor of Narek" (Stepanakert)
 University "Mesrop Mashtots" (Stepanakert)
 Institute of Applied Art "Hagop Gyurjyan" (Stepanakert)

Secondary special education

Craft schools 
 Stepanakert vocational school (Stepanakert)
 Martuni vocational school (Martuni)

Colleges 
 Stepanakert Agricultural College (Stepanakert)
 Stepanakert Choreographic College (Stepanakert)
 Stepanakert medical college named after T. Kamalian (Stepanakert)
 Stepanakert Musical College named after Sayat-Nova (Stepanakert)
 Shushi liberal arts college named after Arsen Khachatryan (Shushi)

Gymnasiums 
 Stepanakert branch of the Yerevan Physics and Mathematics School of A. Shahinyan (Stepanakert)
 Gymnasium of Artsakh State University (Stepanakert)
 High School Ministry of Defence of the Nagorno-Karabakh Republic (Stepanakert)

Military Academies 
 Suvorov and Madatov Military Academy (Stepanakert) 
 Kristapor Ivanyan Military Academy (Stepanakert)

See also
List of universities in Armenia

Sources 
 Атлас Нагорно-Карабахской Республики (in Russian) - page 45. 

Artsakh
Artsakh
Armenia-related lists
Azerbaijan education-related lists
Armenia,Artsakh
Armenia,Artsakh
Artsakh
Republic of Artsakh